is a Japanese footballer who plays for Matsumoto Yamaga FC.

Club statistics
Updated to 24 February 2019.

References

External links
Profile at Tochigi SC
Profile at SC Sagamihara

1991 births
Living people
Kokushikan University alumni
Association football people from Kanagawa Prefecture
Japanese footballers
J1 League players
J2 League players
J3 League players
SC Sagamihara players
Tochigi SC players
Matsumoto Yamaga FC players
Association football defenders